The 4th Korea Drama Awards is an awards ceremony for excellence in television in South Korea. It was held at the Kyungnam Culture and Arts Center in Jinju, South Gyeongsang Province on October 2, 2011 and hosted by Son Hoyoung and Choi Song-hyun. The nominees were chosen from Korean dramas that aired from October 2010 to September 2011.

Nominations and winners
(Winners denoted in bold)

References

External links 
  
 4th Korea Drama Awards  at Daum 

Korea Drama Awards
Korea Drama Awards
Korea Drama Awards